Sam Pilgrim (born 4 June 1990) is a professional freeride mountain biker. Known for his missing tooth and his unique style of tricks, he has gained international fame with his YouTube channel exposure under his name Sam Pilgrim in which he makes videos documenting his extreme stunts on various courses around the world. He was an FMB World Tour overall winner in 2013, becoming the first European athlete to win the competition since its establishment in 2010.

Early life
Pilgrim was born in Colchester, Essex, England and began riding mountain bikes at the age of 9 and quickly won his first competition the Filthy 48. In 2007, he competed in his first international competition season, and at only 17 years old, he quickly became a fan favorite winning his first major competition at King of Dirt in Austria.

Sponsors
As of 2022, Pilgrim is part of Monster Energy. He is also sponsored by Canyon, Motul,  GoPro, Swatch, TSG, Continental, Halo Wheels, and Ergon.

Achievement 
Pilgrim has won dozens of FMB competitions such as Red Bull District Ride in 2011, competing in Dew Tour, various Crankworx events, and the X-Games. He placed 3rd overall in 2011 in the FMB World Tour. He placed 5th overall in 2012 in the FMB World Tour Rankings and 6th overall in 2010.

FMB World Tour Champion 2013
 Won FMB World Tour (1st Overall)
 1st 26Trix
 1st NS Bikes Slopestyle
 1st FISE Slopestyle Montpellier
 1st Swatch Rocket Air
 1st Teva Slopestyle
 2nd Bearclaw Invitational
 2nd at Crankworx L2A
 2nd Red Bull Berg Line
 3rd Red Bull Joyride (Diamond Series)
 5th at Colorado Freeride Festival
 14th Overall at X-Games Munich
 Placed 29th at Red Bull Rampage

References

External links 
Watch Sam Pilgrim crown 'Ventnor - The place to urban downhill', as professional mountain bikers ride the steps
Sam Pilgrim
Sam Pilgrim
Sam Pilgrim's official X Games athlete biography

English male cyclists
1990 births
Living people
Freeride mountain bikers
Sportspeople from Colchester